"Sure Love" is a song co-written and recorded by American country music artist Hal Ketchum. It was released in September 1992 as the first single and title track from his album Sure Love.  The song reached number 3 on the Billboard Hot Country Singles & Tracks chart in January 1993.  It was written by Ketchum and Gary Burr.

Music video
The music video premiered in September 1992. Directed by Senor McGuire (who had previously filmed the video for "Small Town Saturday Night") and filmed in Memphis, TN, it starts with a couple dancing on a balcony, before revealing Ketchum performing in an alleyway with a guitar. The visual then moves to Beale Street, where a fictional movie titled "Hecks Romance" is playing at a theater while a couple get into a convertible, photos are being taken, and Ketchum sings and walks with his guitar. It then moves to a secret club, where the rest of the song is performed by Ketchum and a full band, with people dancing in front. The video ends with Ketchum and his guitar walking down a dimly lit street. 

The first shot of the video (starting on the balcony and going all the way to the band performance) is one continuous shot that lasts 2 full minutes.

Chart performance

Year-end charts

References

1992 singles
Hal Ketchum songs
Songs written by Gary Burr
Songs written by Hal Ketchum
Song recordings produced by Allen Reynolds
Curb Records singles
1992 songs